Ifan is one of several Welsh forms of the male given name John.

People named Ifan
Ifan ab Owen Edwards (1895–1970), a Welsh academic, writer and film-maker
Maredudd ap Ifan, the Head of the House of Cunedda following the death of his father
William Evans (Wil Ifan) (1883–1968), a Welsh poet and Archdruid of the National Eisteddfod of Wales

See also
 Evan
 Ifan (disambiguation)
 Ioan
 Ieuan
 Ianto
 Siôn

Welsh masculine given names